"The Bed You Made for Me" is a song by American country music band Highway 101, written by their lead singer Paulette Carlson. It was released in January 1987 as the first single from the band's self-titled debut album. "The Bed You Made for Me"  spent twenty-four weeks on the Hot Country Songs charts, peaking at number four.

Critical reception
Kip Kirby, of Billboard magazine reviewed the song favorably, calling it "dynamic" and saying that it is "apologetically country in instrumentation and vocal, with energy and outrage that are almost palpable."

Charts

References

1987 debut singles
1987 songs
Highway 101 songs
Song recordings produced by Paul Worley
Warner Records singles
Songs written by Paulette Carlson